Mucrolysin (Trimeresurus metalloendopeptidase A, mucrotoxin A) is an enzyme. This enzyme catalyses the following chemical reaction

 Cleavage of Ser9-His, His10-Leu, Ala14-Leu, Leu15-Tyr and Tyr16-Leu bonds in insulin B chain

This endopeptidase from the venom of Taiwan habu snake (Protobothrops mucrosquamatus).

References

External links 
 

EC 3.4.24